Lemonhead(s) may refer to:
Lemonhead (candy), a brand of candy produced by the Ferrara Pan Candy Company
The Lemonheads, an alternative rock band from the United States
The Lemonheads (album)
Lemonhead, a character in the video game series Monkey Island
"Lemon Head", a song by Lil Yachty from the album Lil Boat 3

See also

 
 

Cleo Lemon (nicknamed "Lemonhead"), former NFL quarterback
Coreocarpus arizonicus (little lemonhead), a North American species of flowering plants in the daisy family
Curtis Lemansky (nicknamed "Lemonhead"), a character from television series "The Shield"